My First Time may refer to:

 My First Time (album), 2003 album by Look What I Did
 My First Time (play), 2007 off-Broadway play
 My First Time (film series), short film interview series produced by The Paris Review
 My First Time (TV series), 2015 Korean TV series